Labor omnia vincit or Labor omnia vincit improbus is a Latin phrase meaning "Work conquers all". The phrase is adapted from Virgil's Georgics, Book I, lines 145–6: ...Labor omnia vicit / improbus ("Steady work overcame all things"). The poem was written in support of Augustus Caesar's "Back to the land" policy, aimed at encouraging more Romans to become farmers. . The actual meaning of the phrase can be obtained as the following: "anything can be achieved if proper work is applied".

Labor movement
A frequent motto within the U.S labor movement, the phrase is a historically significant slogan.  Used by the earliest U.S labor unions such as the American Federation of Labor and other precursors to the modern AFL-CIO, the motto continues to be a traditional and defining statement of purpose on contemporary labor union emblems including the International Union of Operating Engineers and the United Brotherhood of Carpenters and Joiners of America.  The motto also appears on the original 1925 flag of the Brotherhood of Sleeping Car Porters, the labor union of African-American Pullman Company porters founded by civil rights leader A. Philip Randolph. The College of Engineering, Guindy in Chennai, India and founded in the year 1794 has the phrase "Labor Omnia Vincit" in its logo.  This may be the earliest adoption of the phrase by any organization.

The motto is used by the Geelong Trades Hall Council in Australia.

Cities, states, and recreation
The phrase is also a frequent motto across many townships, cities, and states. Currently the state motto of the State of Oklahoma and incorporated into its state seal in 1907, the slogan originally appeared on the territorial seal of Oklahoma Territory. In addition, it has been known to be the motto of the city of El Eulma, Algeria as shown on its coat of arms, of the towns and cities of Bradford, West Yorkshire, West Bromwich, and Ilkeston in England, the motto of Wrexham County Borough Council in Wales and the state motto of Zacatecas granted by King Phillip II in 1588 and the city of León, State of Guanajuato, Mexico, and in the city of Presidente Prudente, Brazil as well as the city of Polokwane, formerly known as Pietersburg in South Africa. It is the motto of Carlton Cricket Club in Barbados. It is also the motto of Kajang High School and St Jago High School (Jamaica) as well as Mitchell High School in Durban, South Africa. It is a slogan of the football clubs Rasta IL in Norway and Luton Borough Youth in England. The phrase can be seen written in the golden letters on the so-called Kroch-Hochhaus in the center of German city Leipzig. It is also the motto of West Bromwich Albion FC • In cinema this slogan was used in a landmark French picture "Le Voyage dans la lune" or "A Trip To The Moon" a silent film brought to life in 1902 by director Georges Méliès. This is a classic vision about a group of men venturing to the moon and back. The scene in which the slogan is depicted comes at the end when they return to earth.

Educational institutions
Many educational institutions have adopted the phrase as a motto, including:

Africa

Bhujoharry College (Boys), Port Louis, Mauritius
Flintstone Engineering, Addis Ababa, Ethiopia
Universidade A Politecnica, Maputo, Mozambique

Angola
Moçâmedes, est. 1840, Angola

South Africa
H. T. S. Loiue Botha, Bloemfontein, South Africa
High School Westonaria, Westonaria, Gauteng, South Africa
Mitchell High School, Durban, South Africa

Ghana (West Africa)
St. Augustine's College (Cape Coast), Ghana

Kenya ( Eastern Africa)
Menengai High School, Nakuru Kenya
Mombasa Technical Training Institute, Mombasa Kenya

Lesotho (Southern Africa)
Mamathe High School, Teya-teyaneng, Berea, Lesotho

Nigeria (West Africa)
Offa Grammar School, Offa, Kwara State, Nigeria

South Africa 
Robert Carruthers Primary School, Witbank, Mpumalanga, South Africa
Tshepagalang High School Northwest [Brit]

Zambia (Southern Africa)
St Paul's Mulungushi Secondary School, Kabwe, Zambia, founded in 1960 by Marist Brothers.

Asia
The Elite's Co-Ed School, Kathmandu, Nepal
Greenwich University, Karachi, Pakistan

Hong Kong
Queen's College, Hong Kong
St. Simon's Lui Ming Choi Secondary Technical School

India
Albany Hall Public School, Kolkata, India
College of Engineering, Guindy, Chennai, India
Government Aizawl College, Aizawl, India
Grant Medical College, Mumbai, India
Indus Academy, Hyderabad, India
Kohima Science College, Jotsoma, India
St. John's Senior Secondary School, Meerut, India
St. Joseph's Higher Secondary School, Cuddalore, India
St. Jude's School, Amritsar, India
St. Kabir Public School, Chandigarh, India
St. Mary's Convent High School, Nainital, India
St. Sebastian Goan High School, Mumbai, India
Sydenham College, Mumbai, India

Malaysia
Gajah Berang Secondary English School, Malacca, Malaysia
Kajang High School, Kajang, Selangor, Malaysia
Sekolah Menengah Gajah Berang, Melaka, Malaysia
St. Xavier's Institution, Penang, Malaysia

Singapore
Montfort Secondary School
Outram Secondary School
St. Gabriel's Secondary School

Sri Lanka
Royal College Colombo
Royal College Wayamba, Kurunegala

Thailand
Assumption College Lampang, Thailand
Assumption College Nakhon Ratchasima, Thailand
Assumption College Rayong, Thailand
Assumption College Samutprakarn, Thailand
Assumption College Sriracha, Thailand
Assumption College, Thailand
Assumption College Thonburi, Thailand
Assumption College Ubon Ratchathani, Thailand
Assumption Commercial College, Thailand
Assumption Technical School Nakhon Phanom, Thailand
Assumption University of Thailand, Thailand
Montfort College, Chiang Mai Thailand
Saint Gabriel's College, Thailand
St. Louis College Chachoengsao, Thailand

Europe
Finland
Hämeenlinnan Lyseo, Hämeenlinna, Finland
Iisalmen Lyseo, Iisalmi, Finland

Romania
Carol Davila University of Medicine and Pharmacy, Bucharest, Romania
Nicolae Kretzulescu Superior Economic School (College), Bucharest, Romania
Mihai Eminescu National College, Constanța, Romania

Spain
Academia Cots, Alicante, Spain
Academia Cots, Barcelona, Spain
Academia Cots, Lleida, Spain
Academia Cots, Valencia, Spain
, (UDIMA), Madrid, Spain

United Kingdom
Altrincham Grammar School for Boys, Altrincham, Greater Manchester
Barnardiston Hall Preparatory School, Nr Haverhill, Suffolk
Cheltenham College, Cheltenham, Gloucestershire
Collingwood School, Wallington, London Borough of Sutton, South London
Elmfield College (1863–1932), Heworth, York
Hamilton Academy, Hamilton, Lanarkshire
Ilkeston Grammar School, Ilkeston, Derbyshire
Kettlethorpe High School, Maths And Computing College, Wakefield, West Yorkshire.
Midhurst Grammar School, Midhurst, West Sussex
Northgate Grammar School for Girls, Ipswich 1931-1977
Strathallan School, Forgandenny, Perthshire
Strathaven Academy, Strathaven, Lanarkshire
The Eastwood School, Leigh On sea, Essex
Tredworth Junior School, Tredworth, Gloucester, Gloucestershire
Villiers High School,  Southall, London Borough of Ealing, West London
Ysgol Bro Gwaun, Fishguard, Pembrokeshire
Turkey

 American Collegiate Institute Debate Club, Izmir

North America
Canada
Ashton College, Vancouver, BC
Barrie Central Collegiate Institute, Barrie, Ontario
Brockville Collegiate Institute, Brockville, Ontario
Brooks Composite High School, Brooks, AB
Elliot Lake Secondary School - ELSS, Elliot Lake, Ontario 
Gloucester High School, Ottawa, Ontario
Hamiota Collegiate Institute, Hamiota, MB
Hants East Rural High School, Milford, NS
Hartland High School, Hartland, New Brunswick
Huntsville High School, Huntsville, ON
Liverpool Regional High School, Liverpool, Nova Scotia
Naicam High School, Naicam, Saskatchewan
Newmarket High School, Newmarket, Ontario
North Toronto Collegiate Institute, Toronto, Ontario
Paris District High School, Paris, Ontario
Queen Elizabeth Junior and Senior High School (Calgary), Alberta
Rosemount High School, Montreal, Quebec
Saugeen District Secondary School, Port Elgin, Ontario
St. Catharines Collegiate, Ontario
St. John's School, St. Jean-sur-Richelieu, Quebec
Whitehorse High School, Whitehorse, Yukon (closed in 1962)
W.L. Seaton Secondary School, Vernon, BC

Caribbean and Central America
Bahamas Baptist Community College, Nassau, Bahamas
Escuela Agrìcola Panamericana Zamorano, Honduras
Zamorano Pan-American Agricultural School
Merl Grove High School Kingston, Jamaica
Rusea's High School, Lucea, Jamaica
Saltus Grammar School, Pembroke, Bermuda
San Juan Senior Comprehensive, Trinidad
St. Jago High School, Spanish Town, Jamaica
The Convent High School, Roseau, Commonwealth of Dominica
Zeta Mu Gamma Fraternity, Mayagüez, Puerto Rico

Mexico
Benemérita Escuela Normal Federalizada de Tamaulipas (BENFT), Ciudad Victoria, Tamaulipas
Instituto Salvatierra, A.C., Mexicali, Baja California

United States
Alpha Phi Tau Fraternity, Heidelberg College, Tiffin, Ohio
Beverly High School Lacrosse Team, Beverly, Massachusetts
Centenary College of Louisiana, Shreveport, Louisiana
Columbia City High School, Columbia City, Indiana
Fessenden School, West Newton, Massachusetts
Gardner High School, Gardner, Massachusetts
Loudon High School, Loudon, Tennessee
Mount Saint Joseph Academy, Brighton, Massachusetts
Peter Donahue Mechanics Monument, San Francisco, California
The Potomac School, McLean, Virginia
Prosser Career Academy, Chicago, Illinois
Puyallup High School, Puyallup, Washington
Storer College, Harpers Ferry, West Virginia (closed in 1965)
Sumter High School, Sumter, South Carolina

Oceania

Suva Sangam College, Suva, Fiji Islands

Australia
Birdwood High School, SA Australia
Bourke High School, Australia
Captains Flat Public School, NSW Australia
Dubbo Public School, NSW, Australia
Glenunga International High School, Australia
Hagley Farm Primary School, Tasmania, Australia
Hampton Senior High School, Morley, Western Australia
Kapunda High School, Kapunda, SA, Australia
Liverpool Boys High School, NSW Australia
Liverpool Girls High School, NSW Australia
Maitland Grossmann High School, Australia
Malanda State High, QLD Australia
Maleny State School, QLD Australia
Muswellbrook High School, New South Wales, Australia
Paddington Public School, Sydney, Australia.
Panania Public School, Sydney, Australia
Peterborough High School, Peterborough, SA - Australia
Princes Street Primary School, Hobart, Tasmania, Australia
Roseville College, Sydney, Australia
Shepparton High School, Victoria, Australia
Sydney Girls High School, Australia
Wellington High School, Wellington, NSW - Australia
Windellama Public School, New South Wales, Australia

New Zealand
Geraldine High School

South America
The Bishops' High School, Guyana

Argentina
Balmoral College, Buenos Aires, Argentina
Escuela Nº 1 Dalmacio Vélez Sarsfield, Concordia, Argentina
Instituto San José de Morón, Buenos Aires, Argentina
Brazil
Instituto Mairiporã - Thomaz Cruz, Mairiporã, Brazil
Macarani, Brasília, Brazil

Chile
City of Punta Arenas
Chilean Gendarmerie
Instituto Nacional General José Miguel Carrera, Santiago, Chile
Liceo de Hombres Manuel Montt, Puerto Montt, Chile
Primera Compañia de Bomberos, Concepción, Chile (A firefighters company)
Saint Peter's School, Viña del Mar, Chile

Ecuador
Academia Naval Illingworth, Guayaquil, Ecuador

Peru
Peruvian Northamerican Abraham Lincoln School, Lima, Peru

See also
List of Latin phrases
Alexia: Labor Omnia Vincit

References

External link

Latin mottos
State mottos of the United States
Symbols of Oklahoma
Virgil